Xihua may refer to:

Xihua County, in Henan, China
Xihua University, in Chengdu, Sichuan, China